Justin Flowe (born October 23, 2001) is an American football inside linebacker for the Arizona Wildcats. He played for Oregon from 2020 to 2022.

Early years
Flowe attended Upland High School in Upland, California. As a senior, he was the USA Today High School Defensive Player of the Year and won the Dick Butkus Award.

A five star recruit, he committed to University of Oregon to play college football. Justin played with his brother Jonathan, a fellow linebacker, at Upland High School and four star recruit in the 2021 class.

References

External links

Oregon Ducks bio

2001 births
Living people
People from Upland, California
Players of American football from California
Sportspeople from San Bernardino County, California
American football linebackers
Oregon Ducks football players
Arizona Wildcats football players